Syllitus bipunctatus is a species of beetle in the family Cerambycidae. It was described by Waterhouse in 1877.

References

Stenoderini
Beetles described in 1877